Zhao Xianshun (1924 – 2 February 2002) was a lieutenant general (zhongjiang) of the People's Liberation Army (PLA) who served as commander of the Lanzhou Military Region from 1985 to 1990. He was a delegate to the 4th, 5th and 6th National People's Congress. He was a member of the 12th and 13th Central Committee of the Chinese Communist Party. He was a member of the Standing Committee of the 8th Chinese People's Political Consultative Conference.

Biography
Zhao was born in Shunhe Township, Yongcheng County (now Yongcheng), Henan, in 1924. He enlisted in the New Fourth Army in 1939, joined the Chinese Communist Party (CCP) in the same year. He served in the 3rd Division during the Second Sino-Japanese War. In 1952, he was called to active duty for the Korean War.

In August 1955, he entered the PLA Nanjing Military Academy, where he graduated in 1958. In June 1985, he was promoted to become commander of the Lanzhou Military Region, a position he held until May 1990.

He attained the rank of lieutenant general (zhongjiang) in 1988.

On 2 February 2002, he died of an illness in Beijing, at the age of 77.

References

1924 births
2002 deaths
People from Yongcheng
People's Liberation Army generals from Henan
People's Republic of China politicians from Henan
Chinese Communist Party politicians from Henan
Commanders of the Lanzhou Military Region
Delegates to the 4th National People's Congress
Delegates to the 5th National People's Congress
Delegates to the 6th National People's Congress
Members of the 8th Chinese People's Political Consultative Conference
Members of the 13th Central Committee of the Chinese Communist Party